The National League is a netball league in Scotland.

The league was founded at the start of the 2022/2023 season, by Netball Scotland.  It has a single division, containing the seven top netball clubs in Scotland.  The establishment of the league was intended to help Scottish players prepare for the 2023 Netball World Cup.

The founding clubs were:

 Bellahouston Netball Club
 Dunedin Netball Club
 Edinburgh Accies Netball Club
 Edinburgh University Netball Club
 Glasgow Saltires Netball Club
 Glasgow University Netball Club
 Strathclyde University Netball Club

For the 2022/2023 season, the Highland Fever men's netball team was also invited to compete in what is otherwise a women's league.

References

Sports leagues established in 2006
Netball competitions in Scotland